Jean-François Ravelinghien (15 September 1947 – 21 April 2004) was a French freestyle swimmer. He competed in two events at the 1968 Summer Olympics.

References

External links
 

1947 births
2004 deaths
French male freestyle swimmers
Olympic swimmers of France
Swimmers at the 1968 Summer Olympics
Sportspeople from Tourcoing
20th-century French people
21st-century French people